Foschi is an Italian surname. Notable people with the name include:

 Francesco Foschi (1710–1780), Italian painter best known for painting winter landscapes
 Franco Foschi (1931-2007), Italian writer and politician
 J. P. Foschi (born 1982), American football player
 Jessica Foschi (born 1980), American competition swimmer
 Luciano Foschi (born 1967), Italian footballer
 Massimo Foschi (born 1938), Italian actor and voice actor, father of Marco
 Marco Foschi (born 1977), Italian film and television actor, son of Massimo
 Pier Francesco Foschi (1502–1567), Italian painter active in Florence
 Sigismondo Foschi ( 1520-1532), Italian painter of the Renaissance period
 , (bon 1964), Italian actress

Italian-language surnames